Penang Road is a major thoroughfare in the city of George Town in Penang, Malaysia. It runs between Farquhar Street to the north and KOMTAR to the south. The road is a one-way road, with the traffic directed southwards towards KOMTAR.

Penang Road is one of the major streets in George Town, as it is heavily used daily by motorists and Rapid Penang public buses heading towards KOMTAR from the UNESCO Site and Gurney Drive. In addition, Penang Road is home to a number of attractions, such as the bars at Upper Penang Road and Chowrasta Market, one of the few wet markets still in operation within George Town. In particular, Chowrasta Market offers a variety of local produce and pastries unique to Penang, such as nutmegs and tau sar pneah biscuits.

A number of hotels also line the Upper Penang Road stretch between Farquhar and Leith Streets.

History 
Penang Road was one of the first roads to be built outside the original town area planned by Francis Light. For centuries, Penang Road has served as a retail street, especially along the stretch running in front of Chowrasta Market. The market was built in the 1890s.

The Penang Police Headquarters at Penang Road was the scene of a number of executions by the Imperial Japanese Army during the Japanese Occupation period in World War II.

Landmarks 

 Komtar
 Chowrasta Market
 Upper Penang Road
 Penang Police Headquarters

Hotels 
The upper-class hotels are located near Upper Penang Road, along the stretch between Farquhar and Leith Streets.
 Continental Hotel
 Hotel Malaysia
 Cititel
 The Merchant Hotel
 Towne House Hotel
 Grand Inn
 Oriental Hotel
 Hotel Central

See also
 Street names of George Town, Penang

References

Roads in Penang
George Town, Penang